Love in 40 Days is a Philippine fantasy romantic comedy television series broadcast by Kapamilya Channel. It aired on the network's Primetime Bida evening block, Jeepney TV, A2Z Primetime, TV5's Todo Max Primetime Singko and worldwide via The Filipino Channel from May 30, 2022, to October 28, 2022, replacing Meow, The Secret Boy and it was replaced by Ever Night: War of Brilliant Splendours on October 31, 2022.

Series overview

Episodes

Notes

References

Lists of Philippine drama television series episodes